Gateway cities may refer to:
 The Gateway Cities region, Southeast Los Angeles County
 Massachusetts gateway cities, a series of midsize urban centers identified by the Brookings Institution, the Massachusetts Institute for a New Commonwealth MassINC, and the Commonwealth government as those facing "stubborn social and economic challenges" while retaining "many assets with unrealized potential."

See also
Business improvement districts in the United States